A light non-aqueous phase liquid (LNAPL) is a groundwater contaminant that is not soluble in water and has lower density than water, in contrast to a DNAPL which has higher density than water. Once a LNAPL infiltrates the ground, it will stop at the height of the water table because the LNAPL is less dense than water. Efforts to locate and remove LNAPLs is relatively less expensive and easier than for DNAPLs because LNAPLs float on top of the water in the underground water table.

Examples of LNAPLs are benzene, toluene, xylene, and other hydrocarbons.

See also
DNAPL
LNAPL transmissivity

External links
LNAPL Definition from the USGS

Water pollution
Water chemistry
Hydrogeology